Tim Marshall may refer to:

 Tim Marshall (journalist) (born 1959), British journalist, writer and broadcaster
 Tim Marshall (radio host), South Jersey radio personality
 Timothy P. Marshall (born 1956), American engineer and meteorologist